Pitaval may refer to:
 Pitaval, in general any collection of causes célèbres
 Der neue Pitaval, a specific collection of causes célèbres, published in 60 volumes between 1842 and 1890 by Julius Eduard Hitzig and Willibald Alexis
 Summa Iniuria: Ein Pitaval der Justizirrtümer, a specific collection of causes célèbres, published in 1976 by Hans Martin Sutermeister 

Pitaval is a surname and may refer to:
 François Gayot de Pitaval (1673–1743), French advocate, who compiled a famous collection of causes célèbres
 John Baptist Pitaval (1858–1928), French-born clergyman of the Roman Catholic Church